Massively may refer to:

Mass
Massively (blog), a blog about MMOs